

Medalists

Heats

Final

References
Results 

1500 metres at the World Athletics Indoor Championships
1500 metres Men